The fountain of Venus is installed in Mexico City's Alameda Central, in Mexico.

References

External links
 

Alameda Central
Fountains in Mexico
Outdoor sculptures in Mexico City
Sculptures of Venus
Sculptures of women in Mexico
Statues in Mexico City